Kamianka may refer to:

Ukraine

Populated places

Cities
 Kamianka, Cherkasy Oblast, a city in Cherkasy Oblast, Ukraine.
 Kamianka-Buzka, a city in Lviv Oblast, Ukraine
 Kamianka-Dniprovska, a city in Zaporizhia Oblast, Ukraine.

Villages
 Kamianka, Volnovakha Raion, a village in Volnovakha Raion, Donetsk Oblast
 Kamianka, Lutuhyne Raion, a village in Lutuhyne Raion, Luhansk Oblast
 Kamianka, Chernivtsi Oblast, a village in Chernivtsi Oblast, Ukraine. Romanian name is Camenca or modern - Petriceni
Kamianka (est. 1596), a former village now in the Amur-Nyzhnodniprovskyi District of Dnipro, Ukraine

Other populated places
 Kamianka, Bakhmut Raion, a rural settlement in Bakhmut Raion, Donetsk Oblast
 Kamianka, Ivano-Frankivsk Oblast, a rural settlement in Ivano-Frankivsk Raion, Ivano-Frankivsk Oblast
 Kamianka, Izium Raion, a rural settlement in Izium Raion, Kharkiv Oblast
 Kamianka, Yasynuvata Raion, a rural settlement in Yasynuvata Raion, Donetsk Oblast

Other
 Kamianka (Bazavluk), a tributary of the Bazavluk in Dnipropetrovsk Oblast
 Kamianka, a research ship of the State Oceanarium, Armed Forces of Ukraine
 Kamianka, a forest reserve of the Synevyr National Park

Poland
Kamianka, Łosice County in Masovian Voivodeship (east-central Poland)
Kamianka, Ostrołęka County in Masovian Voivodeship (east-central Poland)
Kamianka, Ostrów Mazowiecka County in Masovian Voivodeship (east-central Poland)
Kamianka, Sokołów County in Masovian Voivodeship (east-central Poland)

See also
 Kamenka (disambiguation)
 Kamienka (disambiguation)
 Kamionka (disambiguation)
 Kałamanka, a tributary of the Bug river